The 1938 Providence Friars football team was an American football team that represented Providence College as an independent during the 1938 college football season. In their first year under head coach Hugh Devore, the team compiled a 3–5 record. In January 1938, Devore was appointed as head coach of the Friars.

Schedule

References

Providence
Providence Friars football seasons
Providence Friars football